Eclipsiodes homora is a moth in the family Crambidae. It was described by Turner in 1908. It is found in Australia, where it has been recorded from the Northern Territory, Queensland, New South Wales and the Australian Capital Territory.

References

Moths described in 1908
Heliothelini